Vicente Geigel Polanco (May 1, 1904 – April 30, 1979) was a lawyer, writer and a former Attorney General of Puerto Rico.

Early life and education
Vicente Géigel Polanco was born on May 1, 1904 in Isabela, Puerto Rico, he studied at the school Isabela Primary School, secondary school at Colegio José de Diego and high school at Central High School in Santurce, Puerto Rico. Did his studies in law were carried out in the University of Puerto Rico School of Law where he earned a juris doctor.

Career
By 1929 he held the position of secretary of the Ateneo Puertorriqueño. In 1934 he helped found the Puerto Rican Academy of History. Among its many activities e collaborated in the organization of the Popular Institute of Free Education. In the decade of the thirties linked him in the top leadership of the Popular Democratic Party, in addition to He served as a professor of Law and in the Faculty of Social Sciences of the University of Puerto Rico.

References

|-

1904 births
1979 deaths
Members of the Senate of Puerto Rico
People from Isabela, Puerto Rico
Popular Democratic Party (Puerto Rico) politicians
University of Puerto Rico alumni
University of Puerto Rico faculty